KILROY International A/S heads a European group of companies that are leaders in travel, educational counselling and student benefits.

Kilroy International A/S 
Kilroy International A/S heads a European group of companies that are leaders in travel, educational counselling and student benefits. 

As the parent company, Kilroy International serves as the headquarter for the Group and is home to shared functions, managerial and service teams and staff within accounting, marketing, procurement, HR and systems, supporting all 21 branches across seven countries.

The headquarter is located in the city centre of Copenhagen in Denmark.

The Group 
The Kilroy Group drives a number of brands (BENNS, ISIC, Jysk Rejsebureau, KILROY) in seven markets and employs more than 250 people. More about the business can be found on the Group's website. 

The company operates in Denmark, Sweden, Norway, Finland, the Netherlands, Belgium and Iceland.

Operations
The company operates 3 segments:
 Travels sells flight tickets and travel tours to all continents, travel experiences, accommodation, car rental and various forms of travel insurance. Most products are designed for youngsters and backpacker-type travelers.
 Education gives advice and guidance to people wishing to pursue an academic or professional degree abroad.
 Groups arranges study and group tours for mainly student groups in high school or upper secondary school.
 Student Benefits through the student identification and lifestyle card; ISIC.

History 
A wish to improve young people's cultural understanding after the Second World War led student organisations in several Nordic countries to establish travel agencies. These, DIS rejser in Denmark, SFS Resebyrå in Sweden, Univers Reiser in Norway and Travela in Finland, cooperated in purchasing and distributing travel products under the name Scandinavian Student Travel Services, SSTS, from the early 1950s and eventually merged in 1991 to become KILROY. In 1999 BENNS was acquired and incorporated in the Group. I in 2010 parts of the Danish KILROY operations was merged with Jysk Rejsebureau. KILROY Foundation was established in 2013. In 2014 ISIC was launched as a separate brand within the Group. In 2018 Swedish travel agency Winberg Travel was acquired.

References

External links 
 The Kilroy Group 
 KILROY Foundation
 BENNS Denmark - Norway 
 ISIC Denmark - Finland - Iceland - the Netherlands - Norway - Sweden
 Jysk Rejsebureau 
 KILROY
 Winberg Travel

Travel agencies
Travel and holiday companies of Denmark